M50 or M-50 may refer to:

Military equipment 
 M50 joint service general purpose mask, United States military gas mask
 M50 Super Sherman, an Israeli tank
 M50 Reising submachine gun, an American submachine gun
 M50 Ontos, an American tank destroyer
 Madsen M-50, a Danish submachine gun
 Myasishchev M-50, 'Bounder', a Soviet bomber
 Obusier de 155 mm Modèle 50 or M 50, a French howitzer introduced in 1952

Transportation 
 M50 (New York City bus), a New York City Bus route in Manhattan
 BMW M50, a 1989 automobile piston engine
 Suzuki Boulevard M50, an 800cc V-twin muscle cruiser by Suzuki Motor Company
 The FAA identifier of Boardman Airport, Oregon, United States

Roads 
 M-50 (Michigan highway), United States 
 M50 motorway (Great Britain), in the West Midlands / South West 
 M50 motorway (Ireland), a Dublin ring road 
 M-50 (Spain), a Madrid ring road
 M50 (Cape Town), a Metropolitan Route in Cape Town, South Africa
 M50 (Pietermaritzburg), a Metropolitan Route in Pietermaritzburg, South Africa

Other uses 
 50 Moganshan Road (M50), Shanghai's contemporary art district
 Messier 50 (M50), an open star cluster in the constellation Monoceros
 M 50, an age group for Masters athletics (athletes aged 35+)
 Canon EOS M50 Camera